Sostratos of Chios was an ancient Greek sculptor from the island of Chios, who was active around the middle of the 5th century BC.

Biography 
One of his artistic creations was a great bronze statue depicting Athena, which he made it in collaboration with Hypatodorus for the city of Alifeira in the ancient region of Arcadia (but in the modern Andritsaina-Krestena municipality in Elis regional unit of Greece). That statue is mentioned by Pausanias (Description of Greece, Book VIII, 8.26.7) and Polybius (Histories, IV, 4.78.5).

Greek historian Polybius writes: "... arrived at Alipheira. This city lies on a hill defended on all sides by precipices, the ascent of which is more than ten stades. It has a citadel on the summit of the whole hill and a bronze statue of Athena, remarkable for its size and beauty. The origin of this statue -from what motive and at whose expense it was made- is a subject of dispute among the natives themselves, as there is nothing to show definitely who dedicated it and why; but all agree as to the excellence of the workmanship, it being one of the most magnificent and artistic statues in existence, the work of Hecatodorus and Sostratus."

References 

Ancient Greek sculptors
Ancient Chians
5th-century BC Greek people